In enzymology, a trithionate hydrolase is an enzyme that catalyzes the chemical reaction

trithionate + H2O  thiosulfate + sulfate + 2 H+

Thus, the two substrates of this enzyme are trithionate and H2O, whereas its 3 products are thiosulfate, sulfate, and H+.

This enzyme belongs to the family of hydrolases, specifically those acting on sulfur-sulfur bonds.  The systematic name of this enzyme class is trithionate thiosulfohydrolase. This enzyme participates in sulfur metabolism.

References

EC 3.12.1
Enzymes of unknown structure